Dhanora, is a village in Jalgaon Jamod tehsil of Buldhana district of Maharashtra, India.  It is famous for its fair of Mahasiddha Maharaj. It is also known locally as Dhanora (Mahasiddha) to distinguish it from several other villages named Dhanora.

Dhanora is situated 6 km north-west from Asalgaon on Maharashtra State Highway 194. It is connected to Asalgaon with metalled road.
There is an ancient temple and Samadhi of Shri Mahasidha Maharaj in one of the 84 Siddha's in Dhanora Nagari, which is situated in the holy city of Satpura, situated about 06 km away from Jalgaon jamod. It is the second largest and eight-day fair from Buldhana district.
The yearly fair at Dhanora is one of the significant fairs in Buldhana district. The district gazetteer originally printed in 1910 notes it as the second largest annual fair in the district second only. This fair was then too attended by people from distant places. Thise city have historical value because of Mahasidha Maharaj the temple of mahasidha maharaj is very old and have some specialty in it. Thair is many of customs and the priest follow it regularly. The Akhand vina custom started by the great sant sakharam maharaj. Earlier there is some bad customs are present like bali of animals.[2]

References

2.   information about temple and costume 

Villages in Buldhana district